Psilopleura is a genus of tiger moths in the family Erebidae. The genus was erected by Herbert Druce in 1898.

Species
Psilopleura albipes Draudt, 1915
Psilopleura dolens Schaus, 1911
Psilopleura flavicans Dognin, 1911
Psilopleura haemasoma (Curtis, 1812)
Psilopleura klagesi Rothschild, 1911
Psilopleura meridionalis (Zerny, 1931)
Psilopleura pentheri Zerny, 1912
Psilopleura polia H. Druce, 1898
Psilopleura sanguiuncta Hampson, 1898
Psilopleura scripta (Talbot, 1928)
Psilopleura senana (Schaus, 1924)
Psilopleura vitellina Draudt, 1931
Psilopleura vittata (Walker, [1865])

References

Euchromiina
Moth genera